Avetis and its variant Avedis (Armenian: Ավետիս Avetis, from ավետիս avetis, “good news”, alternative form: ավետիք avetikʿ, cf. Avetik) is a proper male name in Armenian. Avetisyan, Avetissyan, Avetisian, Avetissian are Armenian patronymic surnames that derive from Avetis (Avedisyan, Avedissyan, Avedisian, Avedissian derive from the variant pronunciation Avedis). Avetis (or Avedis) means evangel or gospel in Armenian, referring to the gospel (or good news) of Jesus Christ.

Avetis

Avetis Aharonyan, an Armenian politician, writer, public figure and revolutionary
Avetis Isahakyan, better known as Avetik Isahakyan
Avetis Nazarbekian (1866–1939), also known as Nazarbek or Lerents, an Armenian poet, journalist, political activist and revolutionary. One of the founders of Social Democrat Hunchakian Party
Avetis Sultan-Zade (1889–1938), Persian-Armenian communist revolutionary and economist, a founder of the Communist Party of Persia

Avedis
Avedis Boghos Derounian (1909–1991), American Armenian writer better known as Arthur Derounian and by the pen name John Roy Carlson
Avedis Donabedian (1919–2000), Lebanese-Armenian physician
Avedis Kendir (born 1959), Turkish Armenian jeweler
Avedis Yapoudjian (1931–2017), Armenian journalist, historian and writer
Avedis Zildjian Company, established by Avedis Zildjian

See also
Avetik (disambiguation)
Avetisyan

Armenian masculine given names